Georgios Kazantzis (born 6 February 1979) is a Greek football player.

Career
Kazantzis began his professional career by signing for Proodeftiki in July 1998. He joined Aris Thessaloniki in October 2001 but returned to Proodeftiki in January 2004. He also played for OFI Crete in the Alpha Ethniki.

References

1979 births
Living people
Greek footballers
Proodeftiki F.C. players
Aris Thessaloniki F.C. players
OFI Crete F.C. players
Kallithea F.C. players
Super League Greece players
Greece under-21 international footballers
Association football forwards